The Bangladeshi records in swimming are the fastest ever performances of swimmers from Bangladesh, which are recognised and ratified by the Bangladesh Swimming Federation.

All records were set in finals unless noted otherwise.

Long Course (50 m)

Men

Women

Short Course (25 m)

Men

Women

References

External links
 Bangladesh Swimming Federation

Bangladesh
Records
Swimming